East Broughton is a municipality located in Les Appalaches Regional County Municipality in the Chaudière-Appalaches region of Quebec, Canada. Its population was 2,229 as of 2011. It was named following its location in the township of Broughton, in opposition to West Broughton, today's Saint-Pierre-de-Broughton.

East Broughton forms an enclave in the north end of the territory of Sacré-Coeur-de-Jésus.

Sources

Commission de toponymie du Québec
Ministère des Affaires municipales, des Régions et de l'Occupation du territoire

Municipalities in Quebec
Incorporated places in Chaudière-Appalaches